Jack Coughlin (born January 12, 1966) is a retired United States Marine Corps Gunnery sergeant and the author of the autobiography Shooter.

Early years
Coughlin was born and raised in Waltham, Massachusetts, the youngest of five children. At a young age, Jack was temporarily blinded in his right eye (his shooting eye) when a sharp rock ricocheted from a fight between two older boys. His eye eventually healed and his sight in the eye was 20/10. At age 19, Coughlin decided to enlist in the Marine Corps.

Military career
Coughlin enlisted in the Marines in 1985 and completed his recruit training at Marine Corps Recruit Depot Parris Island. His first experiences with operating firearms occurred during Marine Corps recruit training, including shooting a rifle. He attended Scout Sniper school but never graduated. He was also stationed at the Subic Bay naval base in the Philippines with Alpha Company, Marine Barracks Starboard Security Platoon, and later the Jungle Operations Branch. Eventually,  he was assigned to the 3rd Battalion 4th Marines, part of the 7th Marine Regiment of the 1st Marine Division.

Coughlin was deployed with Weapons Company, 1st Battalion, 7th Marines as a "Professionally Instructed Gunman" (P.I.G.) during Operation Restore Hope. He was involved in an attack on an enemy compound north of Mogadishu, Somalia and assigned a hide position to take out targets of opportunity and to report enemy movement. The compound had a ZSU-23/4 anti-aircraft weapon (also referred to as "Zeus") and tanks. Coughlin operated the manned ZSU-23/4 and successfully dispatched the enemy, permitting the attack to be effective. He was deployed with this unit to Iraq in 2003 during Operation Iraqi Freedom, the 2003 invasion of Iraq with  Basra. He spent some time with British Army troops in Basra, then fought with his unit north of Baghdad, and he was present at the destruction of Saddam Hussein's statue. In Iraq, he received his second Bronze Star Medal with valor device. He retired from the USMC when he returned home from Iraq.

Bibliography
Coughlin's autobiography Shooter recounts his military experiences in Iraq, written with Captains Casey Kuhlman and Donald A. Davis and published in 2005.

He has written ten Kyle Swanson Sniper Novels with Davis:

In the Crosshairs. St. Martin's Press. 2017. 

He's also written a book with John R. Bruning:

See also

 Carlos Hathcock†, United States Marine Corps Gunnery Sergeant sniper with a service record of 93 confirmed kills
 Simo Häyhä†, Finnish sniper with the highest recorded number of confirmed sniper kills in any major war (505) 
 Chris Kyle†, former US Navy SEAL who holds the record for the most confirmed kills in U.S. military history, with 160 kills during the Iraq War
 Lyudmila Pavlichenko†, Soviet sniper; most successful female sniper in history, with 309 kills

References

External links

Modern Signed Books BlogTalkRadio Interview with Rodger Nichols September 6, 2016

1966 births
Living people
United States Marine Corps personnel of the Iraq War
Writers from California
American military snipers
United States Marines
Urban warfare